Santiago Ramos Reynoso (born 26 January 2004), known simply as Santiago Ramos, is a Mexican racing driver currently set to compete in the 2023 Formula Regional European Championship for Race Performance Motorsport.

Career

Karting 
Between 2017 and 2019, Ramos competed in various karting championships, such as the German Karting Championship and the WSK Euro Series.

Formula 4

2019 
Ramos competed in the final 3 rounds of the 2019 Italian F4 Championship with DR Formula by RP Motorsport, where he had a highest finish of 20th.

2020 
Ramos signed with Jenzer Motorsport to compete in the 2020 Italian F4 Championship, however he would not appear until Round 4. From then, he scored regular points and finished 16th in the standings, with a best finish of 5th.

2021 
Ramos continued with Jenzer Motorsport to race in the 2021 Italian F4 Championship, this time racing the full season. However, he withdrew from Round 2 at the Misano World Circuit, and did not appear at Round 3 at the Vallelunga Circuit. He finished 22nd in the standings, with 15 points.

He also raced in the first round of the 2021 F4 Spanish Championship also with Jenzer Motorsport, where he achieved a podium which would put him 15th in the standings.

Formula Regional European Championship 
On 28 February 2022, it was announced that Ramos would step up to the Formula Regional European Championship with KIC Motorsport. Ramos moved to Race Performance Motorsport for the final round at Mugello, and was replaced by William Alatalo.

2023 
For 2023, Ramos remained with Race Performance Motorsport for his second season.

Karting record

Karting career summary

Racing record

Racing career summary 

* Season still in progress.

Complete Italian F4 Championship results 
(key) (Races in bold indicate pole position) (Races in italics indicate fastest lap)

Complete Formula Regional European Championship results 
(key) (Races in bold indicate pole position) (Races in italics indicate fastest lap)

* Season still in progress.

References

External links 
 

2004 births
Living people
Mexican racing drivers
Italian F4 Championship drivers
Formula Regional European Championship drivers
Spanish F4 Championship drivers
RP Motorsport drivers
Jenzer Motorsport drivers
KIC Motorsport drivers
ADAC Formula 4 drivers